Kacharu Lal Hemraj Jain was a member of the 6th Lok Sabha of India. He represented the Balaghat constituency of Madhya Pradesh and is a member of the Republican Party of India (Khobragade) political party.

References

India MPs 1977–1979
1943 births
Living people
Republican Party of India (Khobragade) politicians
Republican Party of India politicians
Lok Sabha members from Madhya Pradesh
People from Balaghat district
Madhya Pradesh MLAs 1967–1972
Bharatiya Janata Party politicians from Madhya Pradesh